The Sunshine Coast University Hospital is a hospital on the Sunshine Coast, Queensland, Australia. It is affiliated with the University of the Sunshine Coast and Griffith University.

History
In July 2012, Minister for Health Lawrence Springborg from the Newman Ministry of the Queensland Government appointed the Exemplar Health consortium comprising Lendlease, Capella Capital, Siemens and Spotless to deliver the Sunshine Coast University Hospital (SCUH) as a public–private partnership. Construction began in October 2012. It opened in March 2017 with 450 beds, this is expected to increase to 738 by 2021. It was the first teaching hospital to open in Australia for 20 years. It cost $1.8 billion. The hospital was designed by Sunshine Coast Architects, a partnership between Architectus Brisbane, Stantec Architecture and HDR Rice Daubney of Sydney. Engineering design services were provided by Aurecon.

References

External links

Buildings and structures on the Sunshine Coast, Queensland
Hospitals established in 2017
Hospitals in Queensland
Kawana Waters, Queensland
Teaching hospitals in Australia
2017 establishments in Australia